Nyridela chalciope is a moth of the subfamily Arctiinae. It was described by Jacob Hübner in 1831. It is found in the West Indies (Guadeloupe, St. Kitts, Jamaica, Puerto Rico), Central America, Panama and Colombia.

The larvae feed on Cupania americana.

References

Euchromiina
Moths described in 1827